The Roman Catholic Diocese of Alaminos is a Roman Rite diocese of the Latin Church of the Catholic Church in the Philippines.

The diocese was erected on January 12, 1985, and comprises 14 municipalities in the western part of the province of Pangasinan. The diocese has experience no jurisdictional changes, and is a suffragan of the Archdiocese of Lingayen-Dagupan.

The see became vacant upon the appointment of Bishop Ricardo Lingan Baccay as archbishop of Tuguegarao on October 18, 2019. On January 14, 2020, Pope Francis appointed Fidelis Bautista Layog Auxiliary Bishop of Lingayen-Dagupan as the Apostolic Administrator of the diocese.

Ordinaries

See also
Catholic Church in the Philippines
List of Catholic dioceses in the Philippines

References

External links

catholic-hierarchy-diocese of alaminos
cbcponline.org – diocese of alaminos
philippine islands 

Alaminos
Alaminos
Christian organizations established in 1985
Roman Catholic dioceses and prelatures established in the 20th century
Religion in Pangasinan
1985 establishments in the Philippines